Álvaro Enrique Morales Rojas (born Santiago, September 14, 1968) is a Chilean theater and television actor. For his interpretations, he has been the recipient of several awards, among them being the winner of an APES for best leading actor for his role as Martín Ortúzar in the telenovela Los Pincheira.

He attended the Fernando González Theater Club, where together with Marcelo Leonart – his friend from school – he founded the Merri Melodys theater company. It was also there that Verónica Saquel and María Eugenia Rencoret discovered him and offered him a supporting role in the television series Ámame in 1993. Some of his most recognized collaborations are those with the director Vicente Sabatini, among them the box office hit Rompecorazón (1994), Estúpido Cupido (1995), Sucupira (1996) and its sequel Sucupira, la comedia (1998), Oro Verde (1997), Iorana (1998), La Fiera (1999), Romané (2000), Pampa Ilusión (2001), El circo de las Montini (2002), Los Pincheira (2004), among others.

In 2004, Morales played Martín Ortúzar, the antagonist of Los Pincheira, an evil and powerful landowner who owns most of the land in the area. Faced with his choice as an antagonist, Morales declared: "We are actors by trade and profession, and for the same reason any of us who are can be in the main roles. That is why I think that director Vicente Sabatini chose me for the casting, for my age and the closeness that my appearance provokes with who will be my partner and antagonist." For his performance, Morales received critical acclaim and received the APES award in the category of "Best Television Actor". Morales was widely recognized for his performance in the drama ¿Donde está Elisa? (2009). He played Ignacio Cousiño, a conservative man and family man. However, he hides his homosexuality from his family until an old friend of his wife returns – played by César Caillet – with whom he maintained a parallel relationship in his youth. In that same year, he had a sporadic 8-episode participation in Los Exitosos Pells (2009), where he shared roles with Luz Valdivieso, Ricardo Fernández and Claudia Di Girolamo. In 2011, he portrayed the drug trafficker Lucio Santo Domingo in Infiltradas (2011). In the drama he played the main antagonist, and his performance received several positive reviews from critics of Chilean television and entertainment. The character is an antihero, because in the past they did him a lot of damage, living in a very aggressive environment in which he responds in the same way. He also declared "Lucio is a very well written character." In the production, he shared credits with Héctor Noguera, Katty Kowaleczko, Felipe Braun, Mayte Rodríguez and Tiago Correa. At the same time, he was a member of the international jury of the Viña del Mar International Song Festival.

Filmography

Film

Telenovelas

References

1968 births
Living people
Chilean male film actors
Chilean male telenovela actors
Chilean male television actors
20th-century Chilean male actors
21st-century Chilean male actors
People from Santiago